The Liaison Committee is a committee of the British House of Commons, the lower house of the United Kingdom Parliament. The committee consists of the chairs of the 32 Commons select committees and the chair of the Joint Committee on Human Rights.

The role of the committee is to consider general matters relating to the work of select committees. It advises the House of Commons Commission on select committees as well as choosing select committee reports for debate in the chamber.

Since 2002, the Prime Minister has appeared annually before the Liaison Committee in order to give evidence on matters of public policy. The Liaison Committee is the only Commons committee that questions the prime minister and generally meets twice a year.

Membership
As of 14 March 2023, the members of the committee are as follows:

See also
List of Committees of the United Kingdom Parliament

References

External links
Liaison Committee website
Records for this Committee are kept at the Parliamentary Archives

Select Committees of the British House of Commons